Steve James (born March 8, 1954) is an American film producer and director of several documentaries, including Hoop Dreams (1994), Stevie (2002), The Interrupters (2011), Life Itself (2014), and Abacus: Small Enough to Jail (2016).

Early life
James was born in Hampton, Virginia.

Career
In 1997, James directed the feature film Prefontaine and the TV movies Passing Glory and Joe and Max. His film, The Interrupters a portrayal of a year inside the lives of former gang members in Chicago who now intervene in violent conflicts, was released in January 2011 after premiering at the Sundance Film Festival. The film is his sixth feature length collaboration with his long-time filmmaking home, the non-profit Chicago production studio Kartemquin Films. It was his fifth feature to be accepted into the Sundance Film Festival.

While working with Kartemquin Films, James has produced many films that pursue social inquiry and change. Their collaborations include the 1994 hit Hoop Dreams, James' best known works. Kartemquin films, a non-profit group that produces films promoting "social inquiry", is based in Chicago. Much of James' work is based in the area, predominantly the inner city and impoverished areas. Their collaborations often involve the topics of sports and race, including the ESPN 30 for 30 film No Crossover: The Trial of Allen Iverson. On September 7, 2012, it was announced via social networking site Twitter that James would be involved in the making of a documentary on the life of film critic Roger Ebert which eventually became the 2014 film Life Itself.

He directed the documentary film Head Games which follows football player and wrestler Chris Nowinski's quest to uncover the truth about the consequences of sports related head injuries.

Influences
He is a graduate of James Madison University. His work, he tells journalist Robert K. Elder in an interview for The Film That Changed My Life, was strongly influenced by the film Harlan County, USA:

There've been many documentaries over the years that have powerfully impacted me. I think this one came along at the time when I was more interested in being a feature filmmaker than a documentary filmmaker. So it came along at the beginning of a process of moving from an interest in feature film to documentaries, and that's where my career has taken me. It came along at the right time for me. It helped me see, "Ah, this is more what I want to do."

James pulls influence from the original definition of the term cinéma vérité as it applies to the Rouch/Morin method of filmmaking. As with Rouch and Morin, the "people on camera and we in the audience are continually reminded that a film is being made, that we are watching a film." We are reminded through James' presence on screen as well as his cinematic editing techniques, in order to obtain what he believes is a more accurate depiction of truth.

He also was influenced by Robert Altman's 1975 film Nashville.

Filmography
Stop Substance Abuse, 1986
Grassroots Chicago, 1991 (with Kartemquin Films)
Higher Goals, 1993 (with Kartemquin Films)
Hoop Dreams, 1994 (with Kartemquin Films)
Prefontaine, 1997
Passing Glory, 1999 (TV)
Joe and Max, 2002 (TV)
Stevie, 2002 (with Kartemquin Films)
The New Americans, 2004 (executive producer, Nigerian story director) (with Kartemquin Films)
Reel Paradise, 2005
The War Tapes, 2006 (producer)
At the Death House Door, 2008 (with Kartemquin Films)
No Crossover: The Trial of Allen Iverson, 2010 (ESPN 30 for 30 project) (with Kartemquin Films)
The Interrupters, 2011 (with Kartemquin Films)
Head Games, 2012
Life Itself, 2014 (with Kartemquin Films)
Lucky, 2014
Abacus: Small Enough to Jail, 2016 (with Kartemquin Films)
America to Me, 2018 (with Kartemquin Films)
 City So Real, 2020
 A Compassionate Spy, 2022

References

External links
 
C-SPAN Q&A interview with James and Sgt. Zack Bazzi, about The War Tapes, July 16, 2006

1954 births
Living people
Southern Illinois University alumni
American film directors
American documentary film producers
Directors Guild of America Award winners
James Madison University alumni